Aida is a surname. Notable people with the surname include:

, Japanese historian
, Japanese photographer
, Japanese rower
, contemporary Japanese artist
 or Masae Aida (会田 昌江, 1920-2015), Japanese actress
Miriam Aïda (born 1974), Swedish jazz singer
, Japanese poet and calligrapher
, Japanese voice actress
, Japanese voice actor
, Japanese popular music artist and actress
, Japanese award-winning polymer chemist
Tita Aida, American activist and advocate for HIV/AIDS awareness
, Japanese manga author and illustrator
, Japanese model and AV idol
, Japanese footballer
, Japanese baseball player

Japanese-language surnames